The Kansas City Royals are a Major League Baseball (MLB) team based in Kansas City, Missouri. They have competed in the American League (AL) since the team began play in 1969, and in the AL Central division since 1994. The team's list of records includes batting and pitching records set in single games, single seasons and careers, by both the team and individual players.

Single season records

Single season batting
Batting Average: George Brett, .390 (1980)
On-base percentage:  George Brett, .454 (1980)
Slugging Percentage:  George Brett, .664 (1980)
OPS:  George Brett, 1.118 (1980)
At Bats:  Willie Wilson, 705 (1980)
Runs:  Johnny Damon, 136 (2000)
Hits:  Willie Wilson, 230 (1980)
Total Bases:  George Brett, 363 (1979)
Doubles:  Hal McRae, 54 (1977)
Triples:  Willie Wilson, 21 (1985)
Home Runs:  Jorge Soler, 48 (2019), Salvador Perez, 48 (2021)
RBI:  Mike Sweeney, 144 (2000)
Walks:  John Mayberry, 122 (1973)
Strikeouts:  Jorge Soler, 178 (2019)
Stolen Bases:  Willie Wilson, 83 (1979)
Singles:  Willie Wilson, 184 (1980)
Runs Created:  George Brett, 142 (1985)
Extra-Base Hits:  Hal McRae, 86 (1977)
Times on Base:  Mike Sweeney, 292 (2000)
Sacrifice Hits:  Tom Goodwin, 21 (1996)
Intentional Walks:  George Brett, 31 (1985)
Grounded into Double Plays:  Billy Butler, 32 (2010)
At Bats per Strikeout:  George Brett, 23.5 (1977)
At Bats per Home Run:  Bob Hamelin, 13.0 (1994)
Outs:  Carlos Beltrán, 504 (1999)
Most times Hit By Pitch: David DeJesus, 23 (2007)

Single season pitching
ERA:  Roger Nelson, 2.08 (1972)
Wins:  Bret Saberhagen, 23 (1989)
Losses:  Paul Splittorff and Darrell May, 19 (1974, 2004)
Won-Loss %:  Larry Gura, .800 (1978)
Saves:  Greg Holland 47 2013
WHIP:  Roger Nelson, .871 (1972)
Hits Allowed/9IP:  Roger Nelson, 6.23 (1972)
Walks/9IP:  Doug Bird, 1.41 (1976)
Strikeouts/9IP:  Kevin Appier, 8.82 (1996)
Games:  Dan Quisenberry, 84 (1985)
Innings:  Dennis Leonard, 294 ⅔ (1978)
Strikeouts:  Dennis Leonard, 244 (1977)
Games Started:  Dennis Leonard, 40 (1978)
Complete Games:  Dennis Leonard, 21 (1977)
Shutouts:  Roger Nelson, 6 (1972)
Home Runs Allowed:  Darrell May, 38 (2004)
Walks Allowed:  Mark Gubicza, 120 (1987)
Hits Allowed:  Steve Busby, 284 (1974)
Strikeout to Walk:  Bret Saberhagen, 4.49 (1989)
Earned Runs Allowed:  José Lima, 131 (2005)
Wild Pitches:  Dan Reichert, 18 (2000)
Batters Faced:  Steve Busby, 1,220 (1974)
Games Finished:  Dan Quisenberry, 76 (1985)

Career records

Career batting
Batting Average: George Brett, .305
On-base percentage:  Kevin Seitzer, .380
Slugging Percentage:  Danny Tartabull, .518
OPS:  Danny Tartabull, .894
Games:  George Brett, 2,707
At Bats:  George Brett, 10,349
Runs:  George Brett, 1,583
Hits:  George Brett, 3,154
Total Bases:  George Brett, 5,044
Doubles:  George Brett, 665
Triples:  George Brett, 137
Home Runs:  George Brett, 317
RBI:  George Brett, 1,595
Walks:  George Brett, 1,096
Strikeouts:  Frank White, 1,035
Stolen Bases:  Willie Wilson, 612
Singles:  George Brett, 2,035
Runs Created:  George Brett, 1,892
Extra-Base Hits:  George Brett, 1,119
Times on Base:  George Brett, 4,283
Hit By Pitch:  Mike Macfarlane, 78
Sacrifice Hits:  Frank White, 101
Sacrifice Flies:  George Brett, 120
Intentional Walks:  George Brett, 229
Grounded into Double Plays:  George Brett, 235
At Bats per Strikeout:  Cookie Rojas, 13.0
At Bats per Home Run:  Steve Balboni, 16.8
Outs:  George Brett, 7,673

Career pitching
ERA:  Dan Quisenberry, 2.55
Wins:  Paul Splittorff, 166
Won-Loss%:  Al Fitzmorris, .593
WHIP:  Bret Saberhagen, 1.134
Hits Allowed/9IP:  Jeff Montgomery, 8.05
Walks/9IP:  Dan Quisenberry, 1.36
Strikeouts/9IP:  Tom Gordon, 7.82
Games:  Jeff Montgomery, 686
Saves:  Jeff Montgomery, 304
Innings:  Paul Splittorff, 
Strikeouts:  Kevin Appier, 1,458
Games Started:  Paul Splittorff, 392
Complete Games:  Dennis Leonard, 103
Shutouts:  Dennis Leonard, 23
Home Runs Allowed:  Dennis Leonard, 202
Walks Allowed:  Mark Gubicza, 783
Hits Allowed:  Paul Splittorff, 2,644
Strikeout to Walk:  Bret Saberhagen, 3.30
Losses:  Paul Splittorff, 143
Earned Runs Allowed:  Paul Splittorff, 1,082
Wild Pitches:  Mark Gubicza, 107
Hit Batsmen:  Mark Gubicza, 58
Batters Faced:  Paul Splittorff, 10,824
Games Finished:  Jeff Montgomery, 543

Team records

Team batting
Highest team batting average: .288 in 2000
Lowest team batting average: .240 in 1969
Highest team slugging average: .436 in 1977
Highest team on-base percentage: .348 in 1999
Total Hits: 1,644 in 2000
Extra-base hits: 522 in 1977
Hits in a game: 26 vs. Detroit on September 9, 2004 (first game)
Longest individual hitting streak: 31, Whit Merrifield 2018-19
Most .300 hitters in a single season: 4 in 2000
Home runs: 168 in 1987
Home runs in a month: 12, John Mayberry, July 1975 and Chili Davis, August 1997 and ((Salvador Perez)), August 2021
Most strikeouts: 1,091 in 2009

Team pitching
Lowest team ERA: 3.21 in 1976
Highest team ERA: 5.65 in 2006
Most complete games: 54 in 1974
Fewest complete games: 2 in 2007, 2008, and 2011
Most strikeouts: 1,153 in 2009
Fewest strikeouts: 593 in 1983
Most walks: 693 in 2000
Fewest walks: 433 in 1984
Games no walks: 17 in 1992 and 1996
Most hits: 1,648 in 2006
Fewest hits: 1,301 in 1971
Most runs: 971 in 2006
Fewest runs: 566 in 1971
Most saves: 50 in 1984
Fewest saves: 17 in 1974

Single game records

Single game batting

Single game batting: team
Most Hits: 26 on September 9, 2004
Runs Scored: 26 on September 9, 2004
Most Home Runs: 6 on July 14, 1991, May 21, 2003, and July 27, 2020
Most Total Bases: 37 on September 12, 1982
Walks Recorded: 15 on September 4, 1975
Most Strikeouts: 18 on August 25, 1998
Most Stolen Bases: 8 on August 1, 1998

Single game batting: individual
Most Hits: 6 by Bob Oliver (1969), Kevin Seitzer (1987), and Joe Randa (2004)
Most Runs Scored: 6 by Joe Randa on September 9, 2004
Most Home Runs: 3 (8 times)
Most RBI: 9 by Mike Moustakas on September 12, 2015
Most Walks: 5 by Alex Gordon on July 30, 2008
Most Strikeouts: 5 by Bo Jackson (1987), Greg Gagne (1993), and Bob Hamelin (1995)
Most Stolen Bases: 5 by Amos Otis on September 7, 1971
Most Total Bases: 15 by Kendrys Morales on September 20, 2015

Single game pitching

Single game pitching: team
Most Pitchers Used: 8 on September 7, 1975
Most Strikeouts: 17 on August 1, 2016
Most Walks: 14 (4 times)
Most Home Runs Allowed: 6 (8 times)
Most Hit Batsmen: 4 (5 times)

Single game pitching: individual
Most Strikeouts: 16 by Danny Duffy on August 1, 2016
Most Walks: 9 (3 times)
Most Home Runs Allowed: 5 by Sean O'Sullivan on May 28, 2011
Most Innings Pitched: 13 by Larry Gura on May 21, 1980

References

Records
Kansas City Royals